Bulbophyllum hellwigianum is a species of orchid in the genus Bulbophyllum. The species has its native range in Papua New Guinea.

External links
The Bulbophyllum-Checklist
The Internet Orchid Species Photo Encyclopedia

References

hellwigianum